The 1993 Boston University Terriers football team was an American football team that represented Boston University as a member of the Yankee Conference during the 1993 NCAA Division I-AA football season. In their fourth season under head coach Dan Allen, the Terriers compiled a 12–1 record (8–0 against conference opponents), won the Yankee Conference, lost to Idaho in the quarterfinals of the NCAA Division I-AA playoffs, and outscored by a total of 436 to 211.

Schedule

References

Boston University
Boston University Terriers football seasons
Yankee Conference football champion seasons
Boston University Terriers football